Erastus of Corinth (Erastos), also known as Erastus of Paneas, held the political office of steward (oikonomos),  in Corinth, according to the Epistle to the Romans 16:23 of the New Testament. The office is defined as "the manager of household or of household affairs" or, in this context, "treasurer". The King James Version uses the translation "chamberlain", while the New International Version uses "director of public works". A person named Erastus mentioned in 2 Timothy 4:20 and Acts 19:22 is often taken to be the same person.

According to the tradition of the Eastern Orthodox Church, Erastus is numbered among the Seventy Disciples. He served as a deacon and steward of the Church at Jerusalem and later of Paneas in Palestine. The Church remembers St. Erastus on January 4 among the Seventy, and on November 10.

Relevant verses

Erastus inscription 

In 1929, an inscription mentioning an Erastus was found near a paved area northeast of the theater of Corinth.  It has been dated to the mid-first century and reads "Erastus in return for his aedileship paved it at his own expense." ( abbreviated for ERASTUS PRO AEDILITATE SUA PECUNIA STRAVIT.) Some New Testament scholars have identified this aedile Erastus with the Erastus mentioned in the Epistle to the Romans, but this is disputed by others. This debate has implications relating to the social status of the members of the Pauline churches.

Hymns
Troparion (Tone 3)

Holy Apostles,  Erastus, Olympas, Herodion, Sosipater, Quartus and Tertius,
entreat the merciful God,
to grant our souls forgiveness of transgressions.

Kontakion (Tone 2)

Illumined by divine light, O holy apostles,
you wisely destroyed the works of idolatry.
When you caught all the pagans you brought them to the Master
and taught them to glorify the Trinity.

Source: St. Nikolai Velimirovic, The Prologue of Ohrid

References

External links
Apostle Erastus of the Seventy, November 10 (OCA)
Apostle Erastus of the Seventy, January 4 (OCA)
Erastos, Olympas, Herodion, Sosipatros, Quartus, Tertios, Apostles of the 70 (GOARCH)

People in Acts of the Apostles
People in the Pauline epistles
Latin inscriptions in Greece
Early Christianity-related inscriptions
Epistle to the Romans
Seventy disciples
Christian saints from the New Testament
1st-century bishops in Roman Achaea
Saints of Roman Corinth
1st-century Greek people